Giacomo Antonio Melchiorre Ceruti (October 13, 1698 – August 28, 1767) was an Italian late Baroque painter, active in Northern Italy in Milan, Brescia, and Venice. He acquired the nickname Pitocchetto (the little beggar) for his many paintings of peasants dressed in rags.

He was born in Milan, but worked primarily in Brescia. He may have been influenced early by Antonio Cifrondi and/or Giacomo Todesco (Todeschini), and received training from Carlo Ceresa. While he also painted still-life paintings and religious scenes, Ceruti is best known for his genre paintings, especially of beggars and the poor, whom he painted realistically and endowed with unusual dignity and individuality.

Ceruti gave particular attention to this subject matter during the period 1725 to 1740, and about 50 of his genre paintings from these years survive. Mira Pajes Merriman,  in her essay titled Comedy, Reality, and the Development of Genre Painting in Italy, observes that "Generally his figures do almost nothing—after all, they have nothing to do." She describes his paintings as confronting us withthe detritus of the community; the displaced and homeless poor; the old and the young with their ubiquitous spindles, eloquent signs of their situationless poverty and unwanted labor; orphans in their orderly, joyless asylums plying their unpaid toil; urchins of the streets eking out small coins as porters, and sating them in gambling; the diseased, palsied, and deformed; lonely vagabonds; even a stranger from Africa—and all in tatters and filthy rags, almost all with eyes that address us directly...

A characteristic painting is his Woman with a Dog which portrays a rather plain subject sympathetically and without idealization. Like most of his figures, she appears before an undifferentiated dark background; when Ceruti attempted to represent deep space, the results were frequently awkward. His landscape backgrounds resemble stage flats and are often copied from print sources, such as the engravings of Jacques Callot. The realism Ceruti brought to his genre paintings also distinguishes his portraits and still lifes, while it is less apparent in his somewhat conventional decorative paintings for churches, including frescoes for the Basilica Santa Maria Assunta of Gandino and an altarpiece for Santa Lucia in Padua. This limitation is not unique to Ceruti; the Brescian painter from the late 16th century, Giovanni Battista Moroni, was similarly known for expressive portraits, and drab religious paintings.

Gallery

Notes

Resources

External links
Painters of reality: the legacy of Leonardo and Caravaggio in Lombardy, an exhibition catalog from The Metropolitan Museum of Art (fully available online as PDF), which contains material on Ceruti (see index)

1698 births
1767 deaths
17th-century Italian painters
Italian male painters
18th-century Italian painters
Italian Baroque painters
Italian genre painters
Orientalist painters
Artists from Milan
18th-century Italian male artists